Nikolaus Knoepffler (born 1962 in Miltenberg, Bavaria) is a philosopher and theologian. He currently holds the Chair of Applied Ethics and is the Director of the Ethics Center (Ethikzentrum) at the Friedrich Schiller University of Jena, Germany. Knoepffler is founder and president of the Global Applied Ethics Institute a consortium mainly involved with research on bioethics and business ethics.

Life 
Knoepffler studied philosophy and theology in Würzburg and Rome (1981–1990) where the Pontifical Gregorian University awarded him a licentiate in theology (1989), in philosophy (1990), and a doctorate in philosophy (1992). He was awarded the habilitation in 1998 as well as further doctorates in political science from the Leuphana University of Lüneburg and in theology from the University of Bern.

He was a fellow at the TNN (Institute of Technology - Theology - Natural Sciences) in Munich from 1996 to 2000 and was appointed Lecturer in Philosophy at the University of Munich in 1998. He then became deputy manager at TTN (2000–02).

In 2002, he was a visiting professor at Georgetown University, Washington DC. He was then appointed Professor of Applied Ethics at the Friedrich Schiller University of Jena, where he also leads the Center of Applied Ethics (Ethikzentrum), the Department of Ethics in Sciences, and the Institute of History, Theory, and Ethics in Medicine.

He is president of the German Academy for Transplantation Medicine, and of the Global Applied Ethics Institute. From 2005-2019 Knoepffler served as Chair of the Ethics Commission of Department of Social and Humanistic Studies, University of Jena. He serves as member of the Bavarian Ethics Committee and Preimplantation Genetic Diagnosis Commission at the Landesärztekammer Baden-Württemberg. From 2006-2013 he chaired the Graduate School on Human Dignity and Human Rights funded by the German Research Foundation (DFG). He was a principal investigator (2012-2018) in the trilateral project "Hearts of Flesh - not Stone" funded by the DFG that included scholars from Israel, Palestine, and Germany.

Knoepffler speaks in academic and popular contexts on topics related to his field of ethics. For example, he lectured at the “Wissensforum 2007” of the Süddeutsche Zeitung on the topic "Kant and the Stock Exchange." His research specialties include bioethics, human dignity, conflict management, business ethics, leadership, and German philosophy. He has published widely in all these fields.

External links 
 Nikolaus Knoepffler's Personal Web Page
 Chair of Applied Ethics and Ethics Center Web Page
 Global Applied Ethics Institute
Link to Knoepffler's German language Wikipedia entry

Publications 
 Würde und Freiheit: Vier Konzeptionen im Vergleich. 2. Auflage. Alber, Freiburg im Breisgau 2021 (Erstauflage 2018), .
 Den Hippokratischen Eid neu denken: Medizinethik für die Praxis. Alber, Freiburg im Breisgau 2021, .
 Schlüsselbegriffe der Philosophie Immanuel Kants: Transzendentalität und Menschenwürde, 2014
 Der Beginn der menschlichen Person, 2012
 Angewandte Ethik: Ein systematischer Leitfaden, 2010
 Der neue Mensch?: Enhancement und Genetik, 2009 (together with Julian Savulescu) 
 Humanbiotechnology as a Social Challenge, 2007 (together with Dagmar Schipanski and Stefan Lorenz Sorgner)
 Menschenwürde in der Bioethik, 2004

References

1962 births
Bioethicists
German philosophers
Living people
People from Miltenberg